The Lithia Fountain is a fountain in Ashland, Oregon, United States, installed in 1927. Health benefits of water from the fountain, and the city's others, have been debated.

High barium levels forced the city's public works department to turn off the fountains temporarily in 2016.

References

External links

 Lithia Water Service to Resume, City of Ashland

1927 establishments in Oregon
Buildings and structures in Ashland, Oregon
Drinking fountains in Oregon